Lisa Lindgren may refer to:
 Lisa Lindgren (Swedish actress)
 Lisa Lindgren (American actress)